Mazur (archaic feminine: Mazurowa, plural Mazurowie) is the 14th most common surname in Poland (68,090 people in 2009). It signifies someone from northern Mazovia and has been known since the 15th century.

Over 70% of people with this surname live in the south of Poland (mainly between Katowice and Lublin).

Prevalence of the surname in Polish voivodships
 1st in Subcarpathia (9,530) 
 3rd in Lublin Land (8,019) 
 3rd in Opole Silesia (2,512) 
 3rd in Swietokrzyskie (2,512)

People with this surname
 Aleksandr Mazur (1913–2005), Ukrainian wrestler
 Alexander J. Mazur (1969–2016), American scholar
 Alexandra Mazur (born 1986), Russian beauty pageant contestant
 Alla Mazur (born 1965), Ukrainian journalist
 Amy Mazur (born 1962), American political scientist
 Barry Mazur (born 1937), American mathematician
 D. Bennett Mazur (1924–1994), American politician
 Daniel Mazur (born 1960), American mountain climber
 Eddie Mazur (1929–1995), Canadian ice hockey player
 Edward Mazur (born 1946), Polish-American businessman
 Eliyahu Mazur (1889–1973), Israeli politician
 Elżbieta Trela-Mazur (born 1947), Polish historian
 Epic Mazur (born 1970), American musician
 Eric Mazur (born 1954), American physicist
 Federico Mazur (born 1993), Argentine footballer
 Grace Dane Mazur (born 1944), American writer
 Gyula Mazur (1888–1953), Hungarian cyclist
 Henry Mazur (1919-1988), American military officer and football player
 Henryk Mazur (born 1953), Polish wrestler
 Jan Mazur (1920–2008), Polish Roman Catholic bishop
 Jay Mazur (born 1965), Canadian-American ice hockey player
 Jay Mazur (labor union president) (born 1932), American labor leader
 Jerzy Mazur (born 1953), Polish Roman Catholic bishop
 Joanna Mazur (born 1990), Polish Paralympic athlete
 John Mazur (1930–2013), American football player and coach
 John Mazur (ice hockey) (born 1954), Canadian ice hockey player
 Joseph Mazur (born 1942), American mathematician
 Jozef Mazur (1897–1970), Polish-American artist
 Heather Mazur (born 1976), American actress
 Kazimierz Mazur (1930–2000), Polish modern pentathlete
 Lara Mazur, Canadian film and television editor
 Lucas Mazur (born 1997), French para badminton player
 Magdalena Mazur (born 1976), Polish television presenter
 Marian Mazur (1909–1983), Polish cyberneticist
 Marilyn Mazur (born 1955), Danish percussionist
 Mark Mazur, American economist
 Mary Mazur, American producer
 Meron Mazur (born 1962), Brazilian Ukrainian Greek Catholic hierarch
 Michael Mazur (1935–2009), American artist
 Miriam Mazur (1909–2000), American mathematician
 Mirek Mazur (born 1961), Polish-Canadian cycling coach
 Monet Mazur (born 1976), American actress and musician
 Myroslav Mazur (born 1998), Ukrainian footballer
 Peter Mazur (1922–2001), Dutch theoretical physicist
 Piotr Mazur (born 1982), Polish-Canadian road bicycle racer
 Piotr Mazur (canoeist) (born 1991), Polish sprint canoeist
 Przemysław Mazur (born 1978), Polish rally codriver
 Richard Masur (born 1948), American actor
 Rodrigo Mazur (born 1992), Argentine footballer
 Ruby Mazur, American artist
 Sara Mazur (born 1966), Swedish physicist
 Serhiy Mazur (born 1970), Ukrainian footballer
 Stanisław Mazur (1905–1981), Polish mathematician
 Steve Mazur (born 1977), American guitarist
 Vasyl Mazur (born 1970), Ukrainian footballer
 Viktoria Mazur (born 1994), Ukrainian rhythmic gymnast
 Vladimir Mazur (born 1966), Russian politician
 Vladyslav Mazur (born 1996), Ukrainian athlete
 Włodzimierz Mazur (1954–1988), Polish footballer

See also
 
 Mazur (disambiguation)
 Masur (surname)

References 

Polish-language surnames
Ethnonymic surnames